Chinese American church refers to Christian churches in the United States made up of predominantly ethnic Chinese congregations.

Cultural assimilation
Many Chinese churches originate to serve recent Chinese immigrants arriving from Greater China. Church services are usually conducted in Cantonese, Mandarin or other Chinese languages. With the growing numbers of children and youth, there is often an increased need for English-speaking programs to address subsequent generations.

As with other ethnic churches, Chinese American churches raise concerns around "assimilation" into the broader European American context versus preserving Chinese identity, especially with subsequent generations. On one level, this revolves around the preservation of the Chinese language. In other respects, questions of assimilation relate to the loss of Chinese culture, especially as found in Confucianism.

However, while the older generations tend to be less confident in English, many churches find themselves being "multi-congregational" by the fact that English-speaking younger generations are typically served under the same roof. According to this type of church organization and growth model, the problem occurs when the Chinese speaking congregation shrinks and leaves behind the larger non-Chinese speaking members. The failure to attract new members usually means the end of the church, especially when the original purpose of worship seems to be lost. In addition to worship service, generally, churches also serve ministries in their local community context.

Notable churches
 Boston Chinese Evangelical Church in Boston and Newtonville, Massachusetts
 Bay Area Chinese Bible Church in Alameda and San Leandro, California
 Chinese Baptist Church in Seattle, Washington
 Chinese Bible Church of Greater Boston in Lexington, Massachusetts
 Chinese Bible Church of Greater Lowell in Chelmsford, Massachusetts
 Chinese Bible Church of Maryland in Rockville and Gaithersburg, Maryland
 Chinese Christian Union Church in Chicago, Illinois
 Chinese Evangelical Free Church of Los Angeles in Monterey Park, California
 Covenant of Grace Presbyterian Church in Briarwood, New York - belongs to the Presbyterian Church in America (PCA)
 Davis Chinese Christian Church
 First Chinese Baptist Church, Los Angeles in Chinatown, Los Angeles
 First Chinese Baptist Church of Fountain Valley in Fountain Valley, California
 First Evangelical Church Association in Southern California
 First Evangelical Community Chinese Church in Rochester Hills, Michigan
 Friendship Agape Church, San Jose, California
 Oversea Chinese Mission in New York, New York
 Pittsburgh Chinese Church
 Presbyterian Church in Chinatown, San Francisco Chinatown  - the oldest Chinese church in North America
 Princeton Christian Church in Princeton, New Jersey
 Rutgers Community Christian Church in Somerset, New Jersey
 Reformed Church of Newtown in Elmhurst, New York - belongs to the Reformed Church in America (RCA)
 San Francisco Chinese Alliance Church
 San Jose Christian Alliance Church
 Sunset Church in San Francisco
 Trinity Christian Church of Greater Philadelphia in Havertown, Philadelphia
 Victory Baptist Chinese Church of Rochester in Rochester, New York

References

External links 
 List of the largest Chinese churches in America
 Number of Chinese churches in the USA

Chinese-American culture
Christianity in the United States
Chinese-American churches
Ethnic religion